Carlos Juárez may refer to:

 Carlos Juárez (politician) (1916-2010), Argentine politician
 Carlos Eleodoro Juárez (born 1938), Argentine chess player
 Carlos Juárez (chess) (born 1965), Guatemalan chess player
 Carlos Juárez (footballer) (born 1972), Ecuadorian footballer